Bonser is a surname which may refer to:
Boof Bonser (John Paul Bonser, born 1981), American professional Baseball pitcher
David Bonser (1934–2005), Church of England priest, Bishop of Bolton
Horace Bonser (1882–1934), American sport shooter
Sir John Winfield Bonser (1847–1914), British lawyer and judge, Chief Justice of Ceylon
John Henry Bonser (1855–1913), American and Canadian riverboat captain
Mark Bonser (born 1952), Royal Australian Navy admiral

See also
Bonsor